Seattle Song (February 19, 1981 – February 3, 1996) was a French-bred Thoroughbred racehorse who won the 1983 Prix de la Salamandre and 1984 Washington, D.C. International Stakes.

Background
Bred in Kentucky, Seattle Song was sired by 1977 U.S. Triple Crown winner Seattle Slew. He was out of the mare Incantation, who was sired by Prince Blessed, winner of the 1961 Hollywood Gold Cup and American Handicap. He was selected by trainer François Boutin for Greek shipping magnate Stavros Niarchos who paid US$350,000 at the September 1982 Keeneland yearling sale.

Racing career
After winning the 1983 Prix de la Salamandre and 1984 Baltimore Washington International Turf Cup, Seattle Song was scheduled to run in the inaugural Breeders' Cup Turf in 1984, but he fractured his left front cannon bone in a workout at Hollywood Park Racetrack and was retired from racing.

Stud career
At stud in the United States, Seattle Song sired a number of stakes winners, the best of which was Group One (Prix Lupin) winner Cudas, who, like his sire, raced successfully in France and the United States, and Irish Linnet, a millionaire filly who won five consecutive editions of the Yaddo Handicap at Saratoga Race Course between 1991 and 1995.

Seattle Song died prematurely at age fifteen on February 3, 1996,  as the result of paddock accident at Domino Stud in Lexington, Kentucky.

Pedigree

References

1981 racehorse births
1996 racehorse deaths
Racehorses bred in Kentucky
Racehorses trained in France
Thoroughbred family 4-m